The Brazilian sharpnose shark (Rhizoprionodon lalandii) is a requiem shark of the family Carcharhinidae. It is found in the tropical waters of the western Atlantic Ocean between latitudes 13° N and 33° S, at depths between 3 and 70 m; it has been recorded in the following countries Aruba, Brazil, Colombia, French Guiana, Guyana, Panama, Suriname, Trinidad and Tobago and Venezuela. It can reach a length of 77 cm. It is considered Vulnerable in Brazil due to intensive fishing although it may actually classify at a higher level. The flesh is eaten for food but the fins are not used as they are too small. Other threats include water pollution from plastic litter and three specimens have been found with plastic collars on their head or gills. The shark feeds on teleostei and squid. Research showed the shark may be an important predator of demersal and pelagic prey.

References

External links

 

Brazilian sharpnose shark
Viviparous fish
Fish of Brazil
Fish of the Western Atlantic
Brazilian sharpnose shark